Lewis Ratcliff (born April 24, 1981) is a retired professional lacrosse player. Originally from London, England, Ratcliff moved to Victoria at the age of 7.

NLL career
Ratcliff was drafted 49th overall by the Calgary Roughnecks in the 2001 NLL entry draft. In 2004, the Roughnecks won the Champion's Cup, defeating the Buffalo Bandits in Buffalo. In 2006, Ratcliff was named MVP of the NLL All-Star Game, scoring 4 goals, one of which was the game winner with only 4.4 seconds left in the game.

On March 25, 2008, Ratcliff was traded to the Toronto Rock for forward Josh Sanderson. After a single season in Toronto, Ratcliff was traded back west to the Washington Stealth along with Tyler Codron and Joel Dalgarno in a blockbuster deal for former NLL MVP Colin Doyle. He stayed with the Stealth through their move to Vancouver, and announced his retirement on February 6, 2015.

WLA career
Ratcliff was a longtime member of the Victoria Shamrocks of the Western Lacrosse Association out of British Columbia Canada. He is a 2-time Mann Cup champion with the team and has twice led the league in scoring. In early 2010 Ratcliff was traded (with the consent of the Shamrock players and coaching staff), to the Nanaimo Timbermen of the WLA at his own request to be closer to his current place of residence.

In September 2012, Ratcliff tested positive for use of two forms of steroids and a prohibited pain medication during the Mann Cup. Ratcliff has waived his hearing and accepted his suspension which is due to end on November 9, 2014.

MLL career
Ratcliff was drafted by the San Francisco Dragons of the MLL in 2006. He played one game and recorded 1 goal and 1 assist. Later in the season he was put on waivers due to his commitment of playing in the WLA rather than the MLL.

Statistics

NLL
Reference:

Canadian Lacrosse Association

Awards

References 

1981 births
Sportspeople from British Columbia
British lacrosse players
Washington Stealth players
Calgary Roughnecks players
Canadian lacrosse players
Living people
National Lacrosse League All-Stars
Toronto Rock players
Vancouver Warriors players